Noordin Hassan (born January 18, 1929, Penang) is a Malaysian playwright, Malaysian National Laureate.

Brief biography 
He received his secondary education in Malaysia, higher education in England (University of London, 1962–1966). He also followed the course of drama at Newcastle University (1976).

Creativity 
He wrote and performed on the basis of his plays more than 30 productions, in which social criticism takes imaginative fantastic-allegorical, sometimes absurdist forms. To enhance the attraction, he resorts to the techniques of the traditional Malay theater, boldly introduces verses, music, songs, clownish interludes ("No grass in the wind", 1970, "Do not kill butterflies", 1978; "This night the tortoise cried", 1994 etc.). Author of the concept of "theater of faith" (teater fitrah). Considering artistic creativity as an act of worshiping God and knowledge of God, he subordinates this subject to the plot and aesthetics of his works, widely resorting to Islamic symbolism and allegory. Among the plays of Islamic content is the play "Cindai".

Awards 
 Literary Prize of Malaysia (1972)
 Order of "Defender of the Crown" from the Paramount Ruler of Malaysia (1979)
 S.E.A. Write Award, Thailand (1987)
 Title Malaysian National Laureate – higher title for writers in Malaysia (1993)
 Order "For Service to the State" from Governor Pinang and the honorary title "Datuk" (1994)

Bibliography 
 A. Rahim Abdullah. "Melihat Nilai Melayu Melalui Dunia Mungkin Noordin Hassan" – dlm. "Dewan Sastera". Kuala Lumpur: DBP, 1993, No. 6 (Jun), hlm. 63–65; N 7 (Julai), hlm. 80–82.
 Halilah Haji Khalid. Noordin Hassan Dalam Esei dan Kritikan. Kuala Lumpur: DBP, 2004

References

Malaysian writers
Malaysian literature
Malaysian dramatists and playwrights
Alumni of the University of London
Malaysian people of Malay descent
People from Penang
1929 births
Living people